Tangenta (eng. Tangent) is seventh studio album by Macedonian band Leb i sol. The album was released in 1984 for Jugoton and it was originally available on cassette and vinyl. The reissue of the album on CD was released in 2006 box set by Croatia Records.

Background 
After huge success of Kalabalak in 1983, 66% of band including Vlatko himself, had gone to do military service. After that, group reunited for the new album. 

Album received mixed reviews and concerts were least visited than earlier years. 

Biggest hit from this album is "Kontakt je skup" (Contact is expensive).

Album 
The material was recorded in the Belgrade studio Aquarius, and the producer was Kevin Ayers. It was Ayers who gave the album the name Tangenta, and the reason was that the group's music touched on different styles. The biggest hit from this album is the track Contact is expensive. Guests on the album were Laza Ristovski (keyboards) and Nenad Jelić (percussion).

Track list

References 

Jugoton albums
1984 albums
1980s albums
Leb i sol albums